Lady Killer is a 1951 mystery thriller novel by Anthony Gilbert, the pen name of British writer Lucy Beatrice Malleson. It is the twenty fifth in her long-running series featuring the unscrupulous London solicitor Arthur Crook, one of the more unorthodox detectives of the Golden Age.

Synopsis
Three woman, a young German housekeeper, a tea shop proprietor, and a Colonel's daughter recently come into some money all die tragic deaths shortly after meeting and marrying a tall, distinguished man whose name changes in each case but always keeps the initials H.G. In each case the coroner's investigation concludes that they are accidental, and fails to draw the link between the similar deaths. With satisfaction the perpetrator believes he has got away with murder. Unknown to him, however, the three cases have caught the eye of London lawyer Arthur Crook.

References

Bibliography
 Magill, Frank Northen . Critical Survey of Mystery and Detective Fiction: Authors, Volume 2. Salem Press, 1988.
Murphy, Bruce F. The Encyclopedia of Murder and Mystery. Springer, 1999.
 Reilly, John M. Twentieth Century Crime & Mystery Writers. Springer, 2015.

1951 British novels
British mystery novels
British thriller novels
Novels by Anthony Gilbert
Novels set in London
British detective novels
Collins Crime Club books